Mongolian South Korean or South Korean Mongolian may refer to:
Mongolians in South Korea
South Koreans in Mongolia
Mongolia-South Korea relations
Mixed race people of Mongolian and South Korean descent

See also
Mongol invasions of Korea